Dr Sai Mauk Kham (born 17 August 1949) is a Burmese politician and physician who currently serves as a House of Representatives MP for Lashio Township constituency. He previously served as First Vice President of Myanmar from 1 July 2012 to 30 March 2016. He was elected as Second Vice President of Myanmar on 4 February 2011, defeating Aye Maung of the Rakhine Nationalities Development Party and receiving 84% of the votes (140 of 167 votes) in the Amyotha Hluttaw.

Early life and education
Sai was born on 17 August 1949 in Muse, Shan State, Burma (now Myanmar) to a family of Shan descent. He is a physician by profession, having graduated from the Institute of Medicine, Mandalay (now the University of Medicine, Mandalay) in 1974.

Career
He also used to be the chairman of the Shan Literature and Culture Association. He runs a private clinic and manages a private hospital in Lashio Township.

Electoral fraud 
In 2015 general election, Sai Mauk Kham contested a Pyithu Hluttaw (lower house) seat in Lashio Township. There were allegations of voting fraud which pulled him forward, in a constituency where National League for Democracy (NLD) was expected to win. 11,815 advanced votes had arrived at Lashio’s election commission office at midnight on 9 November 2015, almost eight hours after the polls had closed and the ballot boxes had been sealed shut. Nearly all of the votes had gone to Sai Mauk Kham. The NLD, Shan Nationalities League for Democracy and Shan Nationalities Democratic Party had filed a complaint with the Union Election Commission (UEC). The UEC responded by declaring that the victory of Sai Mauk Kham was legal and that no fraud had taken place.

Personal life 
Sai Mauk Kham is married to Nang Shwe Hmone. He has three children, including Sai Si Tom Kham, a pop singer.

References

|-

1949 births
Burmese people of Shan descent
Burmese physicians
Living people
People from Shan State
University of Medicine, Mandalay alumni
Vice-presidents of Myanmar
Union Solidarity and Development Party politicians